François-Désiré Mathieu (27 May 1839, Einville-au-Jard, Meurthe-et-Moselle – 26 October 1908, London) was a French Bishop and Cardinal.

Biography
He made his studies in the diocesan school and the seminary of the Diocese of Nancy, and was ordained priest in 1863. He was engaged successively as professor in the school (petit séminaire) of Pont-à-Mousson, chaplain to the Dominicanesses at Nancy (1879), and parish priest of Saint-Martin at Pont-à-Mousson (1890). Meanwhile, he had won the Degree of Doctor of Letters with a Latin and a French thesis, the latter being honoured with a prize from the Académie française for two years.

On 3 January 1893, he was nominated to the Bishopric of Angers, was preconized on 19 January, and consecrated on 20 March. He succeeded Charles Émile Freppel, one of the most remarkable bishops of his time, and set himself to maintain all his predecessor's good works. To these he added the work of facilitating the education of poor children destined for the priesthood. He inaugurated the same enterprise in the Diocese of Toulouse, to which he was transferred three years later (30 May 1896) by a formal order of Pope Leo XIII. In his new see he laboured, in accordance with the views of this pontiff, to rally Catholics to the French Government.

With this aim he wrote the Devoir des catholiques, an episcopal charge which attracted wide attention and earned for him the pope's congratulations. In addition he was summoned to Rome to be a cardinal at the curia (19 June 1899).

Having resigned the See of Toulouse (14 December 1899), his activities were thenceforward absorbed in the work of the Roman congregations and some secret diplomatic negotiations. Nevertheless, he found leisure to write on the Concordat of 1801 and the conclave of 1903.

In 1907 he was admitted to the Académie française with a discourse which attracted much notice. Death came to him unexpectedly next year in London, whither he had gone to assist at the Eucharistic Congress.

Works

Under a somewhat commonplace exterior he had an inquiring mind. His works include

"De Joannis abbatis Gorziensis vita" (Nancy 1878); 
"L'Ancien Régime dans la Province de Lorraine et Barrois" (Paris, 1871; 3rd ed., 1907); 
"Le Concordat de 1801" (Paris, 1903); 
"Les derniers jours de Leon XIII et le conclave de 1903" (Paris, 1904).

A new edition of his works began to appear in Paris, July, 1910.

References

1839 births
1908 deaths
People from Meurthe-et-Moselle
Bishops of Angers
Archbishops of Toulouse
20th-century French cardinals
Cardinals created by Pope Leo XIII
Members of the Académie Française